The 115th Fighter Wing is a unit of the Wisconsin Air National Guard, which is stationed at Truax Field Air National Guard Base, Madison, Wisconsin. If activated to federal service, the Wing is gained by the United States Air Force Air Combat Command.

As an Air National Guard unit, it is normally under the command of the Governor, but has a federal role as well. Currently the wing has personnel and/or aircraft assigned to Operation Noble Eagle, Operation Jump Start and regularly serves with the Air Expeditionary Force in Iraq and Afghanistan.

Units
The 115th Fighter Wing consists of the following units:
 176th Fighter Squadron
 115th Operations Group
 115th Mission Support Group
 115th Maintenance Group
 115th Medical Group

History
The wing was first activated as the 128th Fighter Wing in November 1950, when the Air National Guard converted its units to the Wing Base organization, which placed operational and support units under a single wing. Four months later, the wing was federalized in the second wave of Air National Guard callups for the Korean War, and assigned to Air Defense Command. It moved to Truax Field near Madison, Wisconsin where both the 126th and 176th Fighter-Interceptor Squadron flew air defense training missions until being inactivated in February 1952. The wing returned to Wisconsin state control and to its station near Milwaukee in November.

Air defense
The wing trained for its air defense mission until 1958. It was again activated in April 1961, remaining in the air defense mission, although its original group at the same station assumed the air refueling mission. In June 1971, the squadron again moved from General Mitchell Field to Truax Field, where the 115th Fighter-Interceptor Group was located.

In September 1972, the wing's 176th Fighter-Interceptor Squadron won the "William Tell Competition" in the F-102 category. The event, held at Tyndall Air Force Base, included top Air National Guard, Canadian Air Force and active US Air Force units worldwide. The competition included 12 teams of 48 aircraft, each team scored on aerial marksmanship, weapons control, weapons loading and maintenance.

Forward air control
In November 1974, the wing's gaining command changed from Air Defense Command to Tactical Air Command and its designation changed to the 128th Tactical Air Support Wing. With the realignment to TAC, in December 1974, the unit's F-102s were replaced by the Cessna O-2A Skymaster Forward Air Control (FAC) aircraft. The O-2 was the military version of the Cessna 337 Skymaster, a high wing, twin-boom aircraft with a unique centerline pusher/tractor twin engine configuration. The O-2A version was used in forward air control missions, often in conjunction with a ground forward air controller and a radio operator, maintenance, and driver (ROMAD) team.

In November 1979, the O-2s were replaced by the Cessna OA-37B Dragonfly forward air control aircraft. It was developed from the A-37 light attack plane which was used extensively in the Vietnam War as a counter-insurgency aircraft, with the surviving planes either being sold to the Republic of Vietnam Air Force or returned to the United States. The OA-37s were received from ANG units in Maryland and New York.

With most of the pilots and maintenance crews having prior jet aircraft experience with the F-102s, the unit was able to transition the OA-37 to C-1 status, (full combat ready), in less than six months. Awards during the OA-37 era included an overall rating of "Excellent" in the unit's Operational Readiness Inspection, the Distinguished Flying Award and its first Air Force Outstanding Unit Award.

Close air support 
On 1 October 1981, the group was redesignated the 128th Tactical Fighter Wing. Along with the mission change came a new aircraft, the Fairchild Republic A-10 Thunderbolt II, nicknamed the "Warthog". The OA-37s were sent to other ANG units; survivability made the A-10 an excellent weapons delivery system for ground targets. The A-10's most dominant feature is its seven-barrel GAU-8/A 30 mm cannon, capable of firing at up to 70 "tank busting" rounds per second.

During the A-10 era, the unit received two Outstanding Unit Awards, three Air Force Flight Safety Awards, and in 1991 an "Outstanding" in its Unit Effectiveness Inspection. Deployments with the A-10 included Operation Coronet Cove to Panama, and "Checkered Flag" missions to NATO bases in West Germany and England.

Current mission 

With the end of the Cold War, the early 1990s marked several changes. On 16 March 1992, the wing became the 128th Fighter Wing'' and shortly thereafter changed its mobilization command change from Tactical Air Command to the newly created Air Combat Command.

In 1993, the wing began transitioning from the A-10A to the F-16C/D block 30 Fighting Falcon airframes with the enlarged inlet, the A-10s were transferred to other ANG units. The first F-16s arrived at Truax ANGB on 1 April 1993. The current role of the 176th FS is air-interdiction and close air support (CAS). This was the same task as when they flew the A-10, although the transition to the F-16 meant a huge change in the overall execution of this mission when comparing the A-10 with the F-16.

On 11 October 1995, the 128th Fighter Wing was renamed the 115th Fighter Wing and converted to the Objective Wing organization with its operational squadron assigned to the 115th Operations Group. The 128th designation duplicated that of the 128th Air Refueling Wing at General Mitchell Air National Guard Base, another Wisconsin Air National Guard unit, which upgraded from group status.

Operations participated in by the 115th Fighter Wing include: Operation Coronet Chariot, Karup AS, Denmark 1994, Operation Northern Watch, Incirlik AB, Turkey 1997, Operation Southern Watch, Al Jaber AB, Kuwait 1997–98, Operation Southern Watch, Prince Sultan AB, Saudi Arabia 1999, Operation Coronet Nighthawk, Curacao, Netherlands Antilles 2001, Operation Enduring Freedom, Al Udeid AB, Qatar 2004–05, Balad AB, Iraq, 2006, 08, & 09, Africa, 2013 and Operation Noble Eagle, from 11 September 2001 to the present.

In its 2005 BRAC Recommendations, the DoD recommended to close Cannon Air Force Base, New Mexico. As a result, three of the 27th Fighter Wing's F-16s were to be distributed to the 115th Fighter Wing amongst other aircraft moves.

The 176th Fighter Squadron celebrated its 60th anniversary in October 2008.

Today the wing is capable of air-to-air, close air support and precision guided bombing missions. The wing operates the latest generation of munitions such as the JDAM series bombs and the AIM-9X air-to-air missile.

In December 2017, the Air Force announced that the 115th was one of two Air National Guard wings selected for equipping with the Lockheed Martin F-35 Lightning II. The conversion to the fifth-generation jet fighter is scheduled for 2023.

Lineage
 Established as the 128th Fighter Wing on 25 October 1950 and allotted to the Air National Guard
 Activated on 1 November 1950 and given federal recognition
 Federalized and called to active duty on 1 February 1951
 Redesignated 128th Fighter-Interceptor Wing on 10 February 1951
 Inactivated on 6 February 1952
 Released from active duty, returned to Wisconsin state control and activated on 1 November 1952
 Redesignated 128th Air Defense Wing on 15 April 1956
 Inactivated on 10 March 1958
 Activated on 1 August 1961
 Redesignated 128th Fighter-Interceptor Wing on 1 June 1972
 Redesignated 128th Tactical Air Support Wing on 9 November 1974
 Redesignated 128th Tactical Fighter Wing on 15 November 1981
 Redesignated 128th Fighter Wing on 15 March 1992
 Redesignated 115th Fighter Wing''' on 11 October 1995

Assignments
 Wisconsin Air National Guard, 1 November 1950
 Tenth Air Force, 1 February 1951
 Eastern Air Defense Force, 10 February 1951
 Central Air Defense Force, 20 May 1951 – 6 February 1952
 Wisconsin Air National Guard, 1 November 1952 – 10 March 1958
 Wisconsin Air National Guard, 1 April 1961 – present

 Gaining commands
 Air Defense Command, 1 November 1952 – 19 March 1958
 Air Defense Command, 1 April 1961
 Tactical Air Command, 9 November 1974
 Air Combat Command, 1 June 1992 - present

Components
 Groups
 103d Tactical Fighter Group, 16 March 1992 – 11 October 1995
 105th Tactical Air Support Group, 1 July 1979 – 1 May 1984
 110th Tactical Air Support Group (later 110th Fighter Group), c. 1 June 1975 - 1983, c. 16 October 1991 – 11 October 1995
 111th Tactical Air Support Group (later 111th Fighter Group), c. 1 June 1975 - 1983, 31 March 1992 – 11 October 1995
 115th Fighter-Interceptor Group (later 115th Tactical Air Support Group, 115th Operations Group), 15 April 1956 – 10 May 1958, 1 June 1972 – 1 January 1979, 1 October 1994 - present
 119th Fighter Group, 1 April 1961 - c. 1 June 1965
 125th Fighter-Interceptor Group, c. 1 June 1972 - c. 1 October 1974
 128th Fighter Group (later 128th Fighter-Interceptor Group, 128th Fighter Group), 1 November 1950 – 6 February 1952, 1 November 1952 – 10 March 1958
 148th Fighter Group, 1 April 1961 - c. 1 January 1969
 163d Tactical Air Support Group, 8 March 1975 - c. 1 October 1982
 169th Fighter-Interceptor Group, 1 June 1972 – 5 April 1975
 182d Tactical Air Support Group (later 182d Fighter Group), 1975 - 1 April 1995

 Operational Squadron
 176th Tactical Air Support Squadron (later 176th Tactical Fighter Squadron, 176th Fighter Squadron), 1 January 1979 – 1 October 1994

Stations
 Billy Mitchell Field, 1 November 1950
 Truax Field, Wisconsin, 16 February 1951 – 6 February 1952
 Billy Mitchell Field, 1 November 1952 – 10 March 1958
 Billy Mitchell Field, 1 April 1961
 Truax Field (later Truax Field Air National Guard Base, 1 June 1972 – present

Aircraft

 F-89C Scorpion, 1956-1957
 F-89D Scorpion, 1957-1959
 F-89H Scorpion, 1959-1960
 F-89J Scorpion, 1960-1966
 F-102A Delta Dagger, 1966-1974

 O-2 Skymaster, 1974-1979
 OA-37B Dragonfly, 1979-1981
 A-10 Thunderbolt II, 1981-1993
 F-16 Fighting Falcon, 1993–present
 F-35 Lightning II, estimated arrival 2023

References

 115th Fighter Wing website history
 115th Fighter Wing@globalsecurity.org
 Rogers, B. (2006). United States Air Force Unit Designations Since 1978. 
  Cornett, Lloyd H. and Johnson, Mildred W., A Handbook of Aerospace Defense Organization  1946 - 1980, Office of History, Aerospace Defense Center, Peterson AFB, CO (1980).

External links
 115th Fighter Wing Official Website

Wings of the United States Air National Guard
Military units and formations in Wisconsin
115